Acer opalus, the Italian maple, is a species of maple native to the hills and mountains of southern and western Europe, from Italy to Spain and north to southern Germany, and also in northwest Africa in Morocco and Algeria.

Description
They turn yellow in autumn.

The bark is grey and pinkish. It peels in square plates. It has small yellow flowers that open before the leaves appear.

Subspecies
Acer opalus trees with shallowly lobed leaves are sometimes separated as a distinct subspecies Acer opalus subsp. obtusatum. The subspecies was originally described as a separate species in 1806 but was reduced to subspecies status by 1925 However the characteristics are not always constant, so no subspecies are recognized by the Flora Europaea.  Two other subspecies have occasionally been recognized,  Acer opalus subsp. hispanicus ranging from Spain to the  Caucasus Mountains, and  Acer opalus subsp. opalus ranging through France, Switzerland, Corsica, and Italy down to some parts of North Africa.

References

External links
photo of herbarium specimen at Missouri Botanical Garden

opalus
Trees of Europe
Trees of Morocco
Flora of Algeria
Trees of Mediterranean climate
Plants described in 1768
Taxa named by Philip Miller